Elijah Fox Cook (December 3, 1805October 8, 1886) was an American lawyer and Democratic politician.  He served in the state senates of Michigan (1838–1840) and Wisconsin (1857–1859), and was the 3rd Mayor of Sheboygan, Wisconsin.

Biography

Born in Palatine, New York, Cook moved to Oakland County, Michigan Territory, in 1831. He was admitted to the Michigan bar and practiced law in Farmington, and Pontiac.  He served as a delegate to the Constitutional Convention of 1835 which drafted the first Constitution of Michigan.  He went on to serve in the Michigan State Senate during the 1838 and 1839 sessions of the legislature.

In 1847, Cook moved to Sheboygan, Wisconsin Territory, and practiced law.  Just after Wisconsin achieved statehood, he was elected to two consecutive terms as district attorney of Sheboygan County, serving from 1849 through 1853.  During these years, he also promoted the Cascade & Lake Michigan Railroad Company, which planned to build a line from Sheboygan to the more inland village of Cascade.

In 1855, he was elected Mayor of Sheboygan, serving until his defeat in the 1858 election.  Concurrent to his mayoral term, he was elected to the Wisconsin State Senate for the 1857 and 1858 sessions, defeating incumbent Republican David Taylor.

Subsequent to his Senate term, Cook moved to La Crosse, Wisconsin, where he practiced law for a few years.  In 1862, he moved to Milwaukee.  In March 1867, he slipped and broke his leg on a patch of icy sidewalk near his office, sustaining an injury that would leave him dependent on crutches for the rest of his life.  He sued the city of Milwaukee for damages.  Though he was initially successful in the circuit court, the city appealed to the Wisconsin Supreme Court and had the earlier decision vacated.  Cook tried again, resulting in a similar outcome.  Years later, Cook broke his leg again at the same place in Milwaukee, resulting in a paralysis of one side of his body that resulted in his retirement from his legal career.

After his retirement, he returned to La Crosse, where his daughter still resided.  He died at his home in La Crosse in October 1886, at age 80.

References

External links
 

1805 births
1886 deaths
People from Palatine, New York
People from Farmington, Michigan
Politicians from La Crosse, Wisconsin
Politicians from Milwaukee
People from Sheboygan, Wisconsin
Michigan lawyers
Wisconsin lawyers
Michigan state senators
Wisconsin state senators
Mayors of Sheboygan, Wisconsin
19th-century American politicians
Lawyers from Milwaukee
People from Pontiac, Michigan
19th-century American lawyers